The Royal Irish Academy (RIA), based in Dublin, is an academic body that promotes study in the sciences, humanities and social sciences. It is Ireland's premier learned society and one its leading cultural institutions. The Academy was established in 1785 and granted a royal charter in 1786.  the RIA has around 600 members, regular members being Irish residents elected in recognition of their academic achievements, and Honorary Members similarly qualified but based abroad; a small number of members are elected in recognition of non-academic contributions to society. 

Until the late 19th century the Royal Irish Academy was the owner of the main national collection of Irish antiquities. It presented its collection of archaeological artefacts and similar items, which included such famous pieces as the Tara Brooch, the Cross of Cong and the Ardagh Chalice to what is now the National Museum of Ireland, but retains its very significant collection of manuscripts including the famous Cathach of Colmcille, the Lebor na hUidre (c. 1100), the later medieval Leabhar Breac, the Book of Ballymote, and the Annals of the Four Masters.

Work
The RIA is an independent forum of peer-elected experts, operating on an all-Ireland basis, which draws on Members' expertise to contribute to public debate and policy formation on issues in science, technology and culture. It works across the academic world, and with government and business, and it leads national research projects, particularly in areas relating to Ireland and its heritage. The RIA also represents Irish learning internationally, operates a major research library, and is an academic publisher.

Membership
Election to Membership of the Academy is a public recognition of academic excellence and is sometimes held to be the highest academic honour in Ireland. Those elected are entitled to use the designation "MRIA" after their name. The criterion for election to membership is a significant contribution to scholarly research as shown in the candidate's published academic work. However some of those elected to membership are not academics at all but receive the accolade in recognition of other contributions to society: these include former public servants, philanthropists, leaders in political and business life, and others.

Regular membership
To be elected to regular membership, a candidate has to be proposed and recommended by five Members, and selection is made by a rotating committee of existing Members, their names not made known outside the Academy. Presently, up to 24 Members are elected each year, equally divided between the sciences and humanities. Regular membership is open only to those resident in Ireland.

Honorary membership
Honorary membership can be awarded to persons who have made an outstanding contribution to their academic discipline, but who are normally resident outside the island of Ireland. At least two existing Members must propose and recommend a candidate for Honorary Membership. Honorary members are entitled to use the designation "Hon. MRIA" after their name.

Publishing

The Academy is one of the longest-established publishers in Ireland, having commenced in 1787. The Academy currently publishes six journals:
 Ériu
 Irish Studies in International Affairs
 Mathematical Proceedings of the Royal Irish Academy
 Proceedings of the Royal Irish Academy: Archaeology, Culture, History, Literature
 Irish Journal of Earth Sciences and 
 Biology and Environment.

The Academy's research projects also regularly publish the Irish Historic Towns Atlas series, the Documents on Irish Foreign Policy, Foclóir na nua-Ghaeilge, the Dictionary of Medieval Latin from Celtic Sources, and the New Survey of Clare Island. In 2014 the Academy published (in association with Yale University Press) the five-volume Art and Architecture of Ireland.

The Academy is committed to publishing work which not only influences scholarship, but also the wider community, for example Flashes of Brilliance by Dick Ahlstrom, and Judging Dev by Diarmaid Ferriter. Both of these publications have been accompanied by either a television or a radio series.

Research projects
The Academy manages a number of high-profile research projects in the sciences and humanities. Past projects have included The Digital Humanities Observatory (DHO), New Survey of Clare Island (NSCI), The Origins of the Irish Constitution (OIC), and the Dictionary of Irish Biography (DIB).

Other projects include:
Dictionary of Medieval Latin from Celtic Sources (DMLCS)
Documents on Irish Foreign Policy (DIFP)
Foclóir na nua-Ghaeilge (Dictionary of Modern Irish) Online Historical Irish Corpus 1600–1926 
Irish Historic Towns Atlas (IHTA)
Digital Repository of Ireland (DRI)

Academy committees
During the 1950s the Academy began forming national committees, each relating to a specific discipline. Today these act as strategic national fora, providing input into policy, research priorities and issues of public concern, such as climate change. They also organise public outreach activities, such as lectures and public interviews, and award grants for research and travel. The Academy committees are made up of both Members and non-Members, including representatives from universities, research institutions, government agencies and, where appropriate, industry.  They include: Life and Medical Sciences; Physical, Chemical and Mathematical Sciences; Climate Change and Environmental Sciences; Engineering and Computer Sciences; Geosciences and Geographical Sciences; Ethical, Political, Legal and Philosophical Studies; Historical Studies; Social Sciences; Study of Languages, Literature, Culture and Communication; and Coiste Léann na Gaeilge, Litríocht na Gaeilge agus na gCultúr Ceilteach.
 
There are also Standing Committees for Archaeology, International Affairs and North-South matters.

Academy House

The first meeting of the academy were held at the Earl of Charlemont's personal residence Charlemont House. On his application to the Commissioners of Inland Navigation, the academy was then granted the use of a house at 114 Grafton Street named Navigation House around 1787. The academy had already used the building for meetings from 1785.

It appears the society also used 107 Grafton Street as a premises for a period of time.

In 1852 the Royal Irish Academy moved to its current premises at 19 Dawson Street, Dublin 2, known as "Academy House".

Built in c.1750, the building has fine decorative plasterwork and a meeting room designed in 1854 by Frederick Clarendon and now used for conferences, exhibitions and public talks. The Academy allows the use of these meeting rooms by external bodies when its own activities permit.

Academy House was home to many of Ireland's finest national treasures, including the Ardagh Chalice and the Tara Brooch, until 1890 when the Academy transferred its collections to the newly established National Museum of Ireland.

Library
The Academy Library holds the largest collection of Old Irish manuscripts in the world, and is an important research centre for studies covering Irish history, language, archaeology and the history of Irish science. The Library is home to the sixth-century Latin psalter, the Cathach, reputedly copied by St Columcille. The Library also holds the personal library and a harp belonging to Thomas Moore and the philological collection of Osborn J. Bergin.

See also :Category:Royal Irish Academy Library

Governance
The President and Council are responsible for the Academy's general government and regulation. They are elected annually at the Stated Meeting on 16 March. The President normally serves a three-year term of office. The membership of the Council is drawn from the Sciences and Humanities sections. The Council formulates policies and recommends candidates for membership.

The Executive Committee supports the Council in supervising the day-to-day business of the Academy. The members of the Executive Committee are the President, Senior Vice-President, Secretary, Treasurer, Secretaries of Science and PL&A (Polite Literature & Antiquities, i.e. Humanities), Executive Secretary, Secretary for International Relations, and a staff representative.

The Royal Irish Academy became a prescribed body under the terms of the Freedom of Information Act 1997 and the Freedom of Information Act (Amendment) 2003, on 31 May 2006.

Presidents

Awards of the Royal Irish Academy
The premier award of the Royal Irish Academy is the Cunningham Medal, which it awards every three years in recognition of "outstanding contributions to scholarship and the objectives of the Academy." Other awards include the Gold Medals which are awarded to two people each year who "made a demonstrable and internationally recognised outstanding scholarly contribution in their fields," and US-Ireland Research Innovation Awards which are awarded annually in three categories HEIs, Multinationals and SMEs.

The Royal Irish Academy also operates a number of prizes including the annual Hamilton Prize for Mathematics which it awards to the best mathematic students as nominated by academic institutions, the Kathleen Lonsdale Prize for Chemistry which is awarded to the most outstanding Irish Ph.D. thesis in the general area of the chemical sciences, and the biennial RIA Michel Deon Prize for Non-Fiction which honours the life of Michel Déon (1919-2016) by continuing his work in supporting and championing writing talent and sustains his legacy in celebrating the richness and diversity of cultural experience in Europe.

Notable members

See also
Dictionary of the Irish Language
Great Book of Lecan
Proceedings of the Royal Irish Academy

References

External links

Official website

 
Ireland
All-Ireland organisations
1785 establishments in Ireland
Scientific organizations established in 1785
Members of the International Council for Science
Members of the International Science Council
Seanad nominating bodies